Tingelstad is a village in Gran Municipality in Innlandet county, Norway.

Tingelstad is the location of the Hadeland Folkemuseum which is the regional museum for the traditional district of Hadeland. Tingelstad is also the site of two churches: Old Tingelstad Church, a medieval stone  church dating from the 1200s and the new parish church, Tingelstad Church which was built in 1866.

Tingelstad Church

Tingelstad Church is a long church with a west tower, built in red-bricked tiles. It was constructed in 1866 after drawings by architects Heinrich Ernst Schirmer and Wilhelm von Hanno. It was restored in 1958 and 1991. The church is characterized by neo-Gothic architecture. The church is relatively large and richly designed. A number of historic features were transferred from Grinaker Stave Church which was demolished in 1866.

References

Gran, Norway
Villages in Innlandet